Bea Ballard (also known professionally as Beatrice Ballard;) is a British television executive producer. She is chief executive of 10 Star Entertainment, a production company set up in 2009 with investment from Fremantle. She is the daughter of novelist J. G. Ballard.

Ballard co-devised a string of Saturday night entertainment programmes for BBC One, including How Do You Solve a Problem Like Maria? and Any Dream Will Do while creative head and executive producer at BBC Entertainment between 2003 and 2007.

Education

Ballard was educated at St David's School, Middlesex and read English and American Literature at The University of East Anglia, where her tutors included Malcolm Bradbury, Lorna Sage, and Angus Wilson. Following her graduation, she took a one-year post-graduate Diploma in Journalism at London's City University. She completed this with Distinction, and won a scholarship to the New Statesman, where she trained as a reporter and researcher.

Television career
Ballard started her television career at the BBC, on John Craven's Newsround, where she worked as a journalist and assistant producer. She worked at London Weekend Television in Entertainment where she produced a wide range of entertainment shows, from the An Audience... specials (with Peter Ustinov and Billy Connolly, among others), to The Late Clive James, to Michael Aspel and Company, to BAFTA Awards.

David Liddiment invited Ballard to join BBC Entertainment as Head of Talk and Specials. This led to her devising a number of event specials – from the 2-hour gala celebrating BBC TV's 60th Anniversary in 1996, TV 60 – Aunties All Time Greats, to BAFTA Awards, to Ruby Wax Meets Madonna, to documentaries series such as the Emmy winning Carrie Fisher on Hollywood (aco-production with A&E).

She devised the Clive James weekly entertainment show Saturday Night Clive. Following its success on BBC2, the show transferred to BBC1.. Ballard also produced the majority of Clive James' other output for the BBC. She devised and produced the 8 part documentary series Fame in the Twentieth Century a co-production with PBS, shown both in the UK and the US. Ballard also produced the documentary series for BBC ONE in which Clive James profiled various cities around the world in Clive James's Postcard from... (1990–94) from Paris; New York; Miami.

Ballard created and executive produced many specials for BBC One, from One Night With Robbie Williams at the Royal Albert Hall (winner of Silver Rose of Montreux for Best International Music Programme), to Elton John at the Royal Opera House, to the BAFTA Tributes series of celebrity specials -Victoria Wood, Billy Connolly, Ronnie Barker, Judi Dench. She also oversaw all of the BBC's Eurovision programming.

While Creative Head of BBC Entertainment Events, Bea Ballard put forward to the then Controller of BBC One, Peter Fincham, the idea of How Do You Solve a Problem Like Maria?. She successfully got the series commissioned, and off the ground. The programme was the first time that a West End musical had been cast via a television show, with the public voting on contestants drawn from open auditions held all over Britain. The programme has spawned other continuations of the format, such as Grease for ITV and NBC in America. The format is also being adapted internationally for a number of other musicals.

Following the How Do You Solve a Problem Like Maria?, the BBC developed Any Dream Will Do, the search to cast the lead in Andrew Lloyd Webber's West End revival of Joseph and the Amazing Technicolor Dreamcoat.

Ballard also worked with Stephen Fry on Weekend for BBC Four. The weekend included the documentary 50 Not Out, and the programme Guilty. She helped to persuade Ronnie Barker to come out of retirement and reunite with Ronnie Corbett to make The Two Ronnies Sketchbook series.

Ballard re-launched the Parkinson chat show hosted by Michael Parkinson for BBC One. The show featured top international talent – from David and Victoria Beckhams' first solo and joint interviews, to Paul McCartney's first interview following the death of wife Linda, to George Michael and Hugh Grant's first interviews since their lives were affected by scandal.

Chairman of BAFTA Television Committee

Ballard was elected Chairman of the BAFTA Television Committee, and served from 2001 to 2003. Prior to this position, she was elected to BAFTA Council & served for six years. She was also Chairman of the BAFTA Events Committee for two years, producing a number of keynote speeches with channel controllers and she launched The Independent View – a series of interviews and profiles of the television industry's leading independents. During her tenure at BAFTA, she expanded its television programming through the development of the BAFTA Tributes series. She also oversaw annually the television juries and chaired many herself, ranging from drama to comedy.

Ballard programmes for BBC One 
 The Sound of Musicals
 Any Dream Will Do (Joseph)
 How Do You Solve A Problem Like Maria (Best Entertainment Series – International Emmys 2007; Broadcast Awards 2007; Royal Television Society Awards 2007)
 Celebrate the Sound of Music (hosted by Graham Norton)
 Parkinson (Best Ent Series 4 years running at National TV Awards; Best Ent Series BAFTA TV Awards; Best Ent Series RTS Awards; Best Ent Series TV Quick Awards)
 The Two Ronnies Sketchbook (highest rating BBC comedy series of 2005)
 The BAFTA TV Awards
 BAFTA Tributes to Victoria Wood, Judi Dench, Billy Connolly, Bruce Forsyth, Ronnie Barker, Julie Walters, James Bond
 Eurovision
 Making Your Mind Up (re-branded Song For Europe)
 Eastenders Christmas Party
 One Night With Robbie Williams - Royal Albert Hall (Silver Rose for Best International Music Prog at Golden Rose of Montreux)
 One Night With Rod Stewart (Royal Albert Hall)
 Elton John – an Ivor Novello Tribute
 Elton John at the Royal Opera House
 All Time Greatest Love Songs
 The Royal Variety Show
 Victoria Wood's Sketch Show Story
 The Sitcom Story with Dawn French
 Ruby Wax Meets Madonna
 Carrie Fisher on Hollywood (Emmy award)
 Auntie's All Time Greats
 Saturday Night Clive (BAFTA and RTS nominated)
 Clive James Fame in the Twentieth Century ( Emmy Award)
 Clive James's Postcard from... Paris; New York; Miami; Paris

BBC TWO: Saturday Night Clive

BBC FOUR Stephen Fry Night

References

External links
 
Bea Ballard website

1959 births
Living people
Alumni of the University of East Anglia
Alumni of City, University of London
BBC people
English television producers
British women television producers